Arthur Nattle Grigg MC (1896 – 29 November 1941) was a New Zealand politician of the National Party.

Biography

Grigg was born in 1896 to farmer John Charles Nattle Grigg and Alice Montgomerie Hutton, making him a grandson of prominent Canterbury runholder John Grigg. He was educated at Christ's College and was to become a farmer upon completing his education.

During World War I Grigg served in the Royal Field Artillery from 1916 to 1919. After returning home he married Mary Cracroft Wilson in 1920, with whom he had two sons and a daughter. He was a Major in the NZEF in World War II, and was killed on 29 November 1941 when Brigadier Hargest's headquarters in Libya was overrun. He was posthumously awarded the Military Cross.

Prime Minister Peter Fraser described Grigg as "a young member of ability and promise". His widow Mary Grigg succeeded him in the Mid-Canterbury electorate and became the first woman National MP, but retired when she remarried.

References

 The First 50 Years: A History of the New Zealand National Party by Barry Gustafson (1986, Reed Methuen, Auckland) 

1896 births
1941 deaths
Royal Field Artillery soldiers
New Zealand National Party MPs
New Zealand people of World War II
New Zealand military personnel killed in World War II
New Zealand farmers
People educated at Christ's College, Christchurch
Members of the New Zealand House of Representatives
New Zealand MPs for South Island electorates
20th-century New Zealand politicians